Lontano is an album by Polish jazz trumpeter and composer Tomasz Stańko recorded in 2005 and released on the ECM label.

Reception
The Allmusic review by Thom Jurek awarded the album 4 stars stating "Lontano showcases a band confident enough after playing for five years to find real space for free improvisation... Lontano is at once the distillation of 40 years of European vanguard jazz history, and at once the key in the door of the lock where it enters the world not as a music categorized by its instrumentation or personnel, but as music itself; where harmonics, space, and the improvisational language expressed in it transcends genre and classification. This band is simply astonishing, and Lontano is their most adventurous and cohesive recording yet".

Track listing
All compositions by Tomasz Stańko except as indicated
 "Lontano I" (Tomasz Stańko, Marcin Wasilewski, Slawomir Kurkiewicz, Michal Miskiewicz) - 12:53 
 "Cyrhla" - 7:07 
 "Song for Ania" - 7:44 
 "Kattorna" (Krzysztof Komeda) - 6:32 
 "Lontano II" (Stańko, Wasilewski, Kurkiewicz, Miskiewicz) - 15:04 
 "Sweet Thing" - 6:50 
 "Trista" - 4:44 
 "Lontano III" (Stańko, Wasilewski, Kurkiewicz, Miskiewicz) - 12:03 
 "Tale" - 3:55

Personnel
Tomasz Stańko - trumpet
Marcin Wasilewski - piano
Slawomir Kurkiewicz - bass
Michal Miskiewicz - drums

References

ECM Records albums
Tomasz Stańko albums
2006 albums
Albums produced by Manfred Eicher